Daniel Genadiev Naumov (born 29 March 1998) is a Bulgarian footballer who plays as a goalkeeper for CSKA 1948.

Career

Ludogorets
Born in Gotse Delchev, Naumov started his career from the local FC Nevrokop, before joining CSKA Sofia. In 2015 he moved to Ludogorets Razgrad Academy.

He made his debut for Ludogorets Razgrad II in B Group on 4 April 2016 in match against Neftochimic Burgas. After the injury of Vladislav Stoyanov in March 2017, Numov become second choice goalkeeper and on 18 April 2017 he made his debut for the first team in the Bulgarian Cup match against Litex Lovech keeping a clean sheet for the 4:0 win. On 28 May 2017 he completed his debut for the team in the First League for the 3:1 win over Cherno More.

Naumov started the 2017-18 season in Ludogorets II playing in the first match of the season against Lokomotiv 1929 Sofia.

Vereya (loan)
On 30 January 2018, Naumov was loaned to Vereya until end of the season in order to play in the First League. He completed his debut for the team on 17 February 2018 in the first league match of the year against CSKA Sofia. Naumov ended the campaign with five matches only because of shoulder injury and noted that he hopes to become a first choice goalkeeper in Ludogorets for the next season.

CSKA 1948
In June 2019 Naumov joined the ambitious team from the Second League - CSKA 1948, in search of more starting games, signing a contract until June 2021. He quickly established himself as a first chose goalkeeper. In November 2019 he was watched by scouts of Manchester City.

International career

Youth levels
Naumov served as the captain of the Bulgaria U19 team for the 2017 European Under-19 Championship qualification from 22 to 27 March 2017. After a draw and 2 wins the team qualified for the knockout phase which was held in July 2017. In August 2017 he was called up for Bulgaria U21 for the 2019 UEFA European Under-21 Championship qualification match against Luxembourg, but dropped out after receiving an injury in league match for Ludogorets Razgrad II and was replaced by Mihail Mihaylov. Naumov made his debut for Bulgaria U21 on 27 March 2018 in a European Under-21 qualification match against Kazakhstan U21, keeping a clean sheet for the 3:0 win.

Senior levels
In February 2020, Naumov was called up to the senior team for a friendly match against Belarus, but did not debut. He completed his debut on 31 March 2021, keeping a clean sheet for the draw against Northern Ireland for the 2022 FIFA World Cup qualification.

Career statistics

Club

International

References

External links
 

1998 births
Living people
People from Gotse Delchev
Bulgarian footballers
Bulgaria international footballers
Bulgaria under-21 international footballers
Bulgaria youth international footballers
PFC Ludogorets Razgrad II players
PFC Ludogorets Razgrad players
FC Vereya players
FC CSKA 1948 Sofia players
First Professional Football League (Bulgaria) players
Second Professional Football League (Bulgaria) players
Association football goalkeepers
Sportspeople from Blagoevgrad Province
21st-century Bulgarian people